William Charles Brenke (April 12, 1874, Berlin – 1964) was an American mathematician who introduced Brenke polynomials and wrote several undergraduate textbooks.

He received his PhD in mathematics at Harvard under Maxime Bôcher. Brenke taught at the University of Nebraska-Lincoln mathematics department from 1908 to 1944 and was chair of the department from 1934 to 1944. He retired in 1943 but his successor, Ralph Hull, was put on official leave  to do war work and returned from leave in 1945.

Publications

References

External links

NEGenWeb Project - Lancaster County Who's Who in Nebraska, 1940

1874 births
1964 deaths
20th-century American mathematicians
Harvard Graduate School of Arts and Sciences alumni
University of Nebraska–Lincoln faculty
Emigrants from the German Empire to the United States